Anthony Maurice Hemingway (born 1977) is an American television and film director. He has worked extensively in television, directing numerous episodes of CSI: NY, Treme, True Blood and Shameless, among others. He has also directed one feature film, Red Tails in 2012. Before becoming a director he worked extensively as an assistant director in television and film.

Career
Hemingway began working in the industry on Tom Fontana's HBO prison drama Oz as an assistant director. He later worked with Fontana on The Jury. He was the first assistant director on the film Freedomland in 2006 which was written by The Wire writer Richard Price and featured several cast members from that show alongside Samuel L. Jackson. He first worked with Jackson as assistant director on the 2002 film Changing Lanes. He first worked with director/producer Joe Chappelle on the 2000 film Takedown and has since collaborated with him on The Wire and CSI: NY.

For The Wire Hemingway served as the first assistant director on several episodes in the first season and throughout the second and third season. He returned in 2006 as a director for the seventh episode of the fourth season "Unto Others". Showrunner David Simon said that Hemingway's directing debut proved what they already knew, "that it was time." The experience has led to directing work on several other series for Hemingway.

In 2012, Hemingway's first feature film Red Tails was released, produced by Rick McCallum and Chas. Floyd Johnson.

HBO is also developing Bros, a comedy set to be directed by Hemingway and written by Ben Cory Jones, that centers on three African-American brothers — two straight and one gay — who are each dealing with love and dating.

In 2020, Anthony Hemingway signed a deal with 20th Television to produce and direct its own projects.

Personal life
Hemingway identifies as gay, stating that he had known his entire life. He and actor Steven Norfleet started dating in 2014, after being introduced through a mutual friend. They got engaged in June 2018 and married in September 2019.

Filmography

Director

Assistant director
Freedomland (2006) First Assistant Director: Second Unit
The Manchurian Candidate (2004) First Assistant Director: Washington, D.C./New York
The Jury (2004) First Assistant Director
The Wire (2002–2006) First Assistant Director - 23 episodes
The Extreme Team (2003) First Assistant Director
Oz (2002) First Assistant Director - 4 episodes
Juwanna Mann (2002) First Assistant Director
New Best Friend (2002) Second Assistant Director
Changing Lanes (2002) First Assistant Director: Second Unit
Ali (2001) Second Assistant Director: New York
Law & Order Criminal Intent (2001) First Assistant Director
 The Corner (2000 TV Mini-Series) First Assistant Director - 4 episodes 
Takedown (2000) Second Assistant Director
Monday After the Miracle (1998 TV movie) Second Assistant Director
Carriers (1998 TV movie) Second Assistant Director

References

External links
 

African-American film directors
African-American television directors
American film directors
American television directors
American television producers
Living people
Place of birth missing (living people)
1977 births
LGBT film directors
LGBT African Americans
Gay men
21st-century African-American people
20th-century African-American people
21st-century LGBT people